The Brooklyn Nets are an American professional basketball team based in Brooklyn, New York. The team plays in the Atlantic Division of the Eastern Conference in the National Basketball Association (NBA).

Accomplishments

Basketball Hall of Fame

Notes

FIBA Hall of Fame

Retired numbers

Individual awards

NBA

NBA Rookie of the Year
 Buck Williams – 1982
 Derrick Coleman – 1991

NBA Executive of the Year
 Rod Thorn – 2002

NBA Sportsmanship Award
 Patty Mills – 2022

J. Walter Kennedy Citizenship Award
 Wayne Ellington – 2016

All-NBA First Team
 Jason Kidd – 2002, 2004

All-NBA Second Team
 Buck Williams – 1983
 Jason Kidd – 2003

All-NBA Third Team
 Derrick Coleman – 1993, 1994
 Dražen Petrović – 1993
 Stephon Marbury – 2000
 Kyrie Irving – 2021

NBA All-Defensive First Team
 Jason Kidd – 2002, 2006

NBA All-Defensive Second Team
 Buck Williams – 1988
 Jason Kidd – 2003–2005, 2007

NBA All-Rookie First Team
 Bernard King – 1978
 Buck Williams – 1982
 Derrick Coleman – 1991
 Keith Van Horn – 1998
 Kenyon Martin – 2001
 Brook Lopez – 2009
 Mason Plumlee – 2014

NBA All-Rookie Second Team
 Chris Morris – 1989
 Kerry Kittles – 1997
 Richard Jefferson – 2002
 Nenad Krstić – 2004
 Marcus Williams – 2007
 MarShon Brooks – 2012
 Bojan Bogdanović – 2015

ABA

ABA Most Valuable Player
 Julius Erving – 1974–1976

ABA Playoffs Most Valuable Player
 Julius Erving – 1974, 1976

ABA Rookie of the Year
 Brian Taylor – 1973

All-ABA Team First Team
 Rick Barry – 1971, 1972
 Bill Melchionni – 1972
 Julius Erving – 1974–1976

All-ABA Team Second Team
 Brian Taylor – 1975

ABA All-Defensive Team
 Mike Gale – 1974
 Brian Taylor – 1975, 1976
 Julius Erving – 1976

ABA All-Rookie Team
 John Roche – 1972
 Jim Chones – 1973
 Brian Taylor – 1973
 Larry Kenon – 1974
 John Williamson – 1974
 Kim Hughes – 1976

NBA All-Star Weekend

NBA All-Star Game
 Buck Williams – 1982, 1983, 1986
 Otis Birdsong – 1984
 Micheal Ray Richardson – 1985
 Kenny Anderson – 1994
 Derrick Coleman – 1994
 Jayson Williams – 1998
 Stephon Marbury – 2001
 Jason Kidd – 2002–2004, 2007, 2008
 Kenyon Martin – 2004
 Vince Carter – 2005–2007
 Devin Harris – 2009
 Deron Williams – 2012
 Brook Lopez – 2013
 Joe Johnson – 2014
 D'Angelo Russell – 2019
 Kevin Durant – 2021, 2022, 2023
 James Harden – 2021, 2022
 Kyrie Irving – 2021, 2023

NBA All-Star Game head coaches
 Byron Scott – 2002

Playoff appearances

ABA

 1970
 1971
 1972
 1973

1974
 1975
1976

NBA

 1979
 1982
 1983
 1984
 1985
 1986
 1992
 1993
 1994
 1998
 2002

 2003
 2004
 2005
 2006
 2007
 2013
 2014
 2015
 2019
 2020
 2021
 2022

Records

Individual records

Career leaders
As of the end of the 2020–21 season

Season leaders
As of the end of the 2020–21 season

Notes

  Shooting percentages in basketball are calculated by taking the number of field goals, three-pointers, or free throws attempted, and dividing it by the corresponding number of shots taken.
A regulation NBA game is 48 minutes long.

References

accomplishments and records
National Basketball Association accomplishments and records by team